The Landstad revolver was an automatic revolver of Norwegian origin. The weapon had an unusual feeding device that used both a 2 round cylinder and a grip inserted magazine.

It was chambered for the 7.5mm Nagant cartridge, which at the time of the creation of the Landstad was also used in the Swedish Mod. 1887 and Norwegian Mod. 1893 Nagant revolvers.

History
The revolver design was patented in 1899 by Halvard Landstad, from Kristiana (now known as Oslo). Landstad designed the revolver with his own money and presented it to military trials in 1901. The gun never went into production because the revolver failed in the trials, but the inventor kept a prototype of the gun. It was donated to the British NRA after the inventor's death in 1955. In 1977 the revolver was sold in an auction to a Norse wepons collector.

See also
 Webley Fosbery
 Mateba 6 Unica
 Dardick 1500

References

Further reading

External links
 Landstat 1900 Automatic Revolver - Forgotten Weapons
 United Kingdom patent:  Halvard Folkestad Landstad, "Improvements in automatic revolvers", January 13, 1900 (archive)
 German patent:  Halvard Folkestad Landstad, "Selbstthatiger revolver", August 1, 1899 (archive)
 Norwegian patent:  Halvard Folkestad Landstad, "Automatisk revolver", April 11, 1899 (archive)



Firearms of Norway
Firearms articles needing expert attention
Automatic revolvers